Leprechaun Returns is a 2018 American comedy slasher film made as a direct sequel to Leprechaun from 1993. Directed by Astron-6's Steven Kostanski, the film stars Taylor Spreitler as the daughter of Jennifer Aniston's character from the original film, who encounters the title creature 25 years after her mother trapped it in a well. Warwick Davis elected not to return as the Leprechaun, and Linden Porco took over the role for this film.

Plot 
Lila Jenkins (Taylor Spreitler) arrives at Devil's Lake, North Dakota, to help greenify an old house  owned by her sorority at Laramore University. Lila hitches a ride from Ozzie Jones (Mark Holton) and reveals that her mother, Tory Redding, had died the year prior to cancer. Ozzie accidentally drops his phone while unloading Lila's luggage and heads back to retrieve it, only to get sprayed by water from the old well, rebirthing the Leprechaun and causing it to punch his way out of Ozzie's torso.

Lila meets her sorority sisters consisting of Katie (Pepi Sonuga), an eco-friendly and intelligent girl; Rose (Sai Bennett), the self-appointed leader of the group; and Meredith (Emily Reid), a stoner who brings over a group of dudes consisting of Andy (Ben McGregor), a dimwitted student attracted to Katie; and Matt (Oliver Llewellyn Jenkins), a self-proclaimed wannabe filmmaker. After Meredith insults Lila's mother for her fear of monsters, Lila goes to bed and encounters visions of Zombie Ozzie. The next morning, Katie and Andy install a solar panel, while the Leprechaun learns that his powers are too weak due to his loss of gold, and determines that killing will solve his problems. That night, the Leprechaun reveals himself to Lila and Meredith, who takes pictorial evidence of the creature when Matt and Rose rebuff their suspicions. Andy also encounters the Leprechaun, who cuts him in half with the solar panel after he mocks the leprechaun for his height.

Meredith and Lila sneak inside the house to recover the car keys, where Meredith locks Lila in the basement and reveals she made a deal with the leprechaun to have Lila in hopes of leaving the rest alone. The group leaves Lila behind when Meredith reveals that Lila was killed, but soon learn of Meredith's true intentions. Meanwhile, Lila encounters Ghost Ozzie, who helps Lila learn of the Leprechaun's true weakness and of the basement's exit hole. When the Leprechaun catches up to the group on Matt's drone, they crash into a tree and run away, leaving Meredith behind when the Leprechaun reveals a loophole he created in order to continue the murders. The Leprechaun slows Meredith down using sprinklers, and kills her by impaling her mouth with a sprinkler faucet. Matt attempts to slow down the Leprechaun with his drone, but he overrides the controls and kills Matt with the drone blades.

Rose and Katie run into Lila and follow a treasure map that Ghost Ozzie helped Lila discover. The three discover a pick-up truck that contains the gold, but Rose reveals that she cashed in some of the gold to help finance the greenify project. To deceive the leprechaun, Lila stuffs the pot with tampons and offers the gold back to the Leprechaun, but he realizes their true intentions. Lila is able to trap the leprechaun in a circle of iron objects (iron is a leprechaun's weakness) in order create a plan to defeat the leprechaun. Katie restores the power while Rose creates clover juice. Lila stuffs a hose in the Leprechaun's mouth and fill him with the juice, causing him to explode. Rose offers to clean the house, but the Leprechaun is able to multiply himself into multiple small leprechauns using chunks of his body. Rose is able to defeat most of the creatures, but the leprechauns outsmart her and impale her on a trophy. The leprechaun is able to form again before Lila and Katie discover Rose's body.

Lila is able to surround the leprechaun's feet with gold before electrocuting the Leprechaun, blowing up the house in the process. Lila and Katie become covered in green slime and they escape. It's revealed that Lubdan survived at the end. He hitchhikes a ride on a chicken truck on its way to Bismarck, North Dakota so he can reclaim his gold before the credits roll.

Cast
 Taylor Spreitler as Lila Jenkins, Tory Redding's Daughter
 Pepi Sonuga as Katie
 Sai Bennett as Rose
 Linden Porco as The Leprechaun
 Mark Holton as Ozzie Jones
 Emily Reid as Meredith
 Ben McGregor as Andy
 Oliver Llewellyn Jenkins as Matthew
 Heather McDonald as Tory Redding (voice)
 Pete Spiros as The Mailman
 Leon Clingman as University Advisor
 Tari-Starre Michael as Emily

Release
Leprechaun Returns premiered digitally via video on demand on December 11, 2018. The film made its worldwide TV premiere on March 17, 2019 on Syfy. It was then released on DVD and Blu-ray in June.

Reception
Bloody Disgusting gave the film a decent review, entitled "Leprechaun Returns is Far from Gold But Still Manages to Charm".

References

External links
 

Alternative sequel films
Television sequel films
Films about fraternities and sororities
Leprechaun (film series)
2018 comedy horror films
American comedy horror films
Films about fratricide and sororicide
Direct-to-video sequel films
Syfy original films
2018 films
American horror television films
American drama television films
2010s American films